Fadi Malke (born 13 January 1986) is a Swedish footballer who plays as a defender and is a free agent after leaving his most recent club AFC United. He played in the Allsvenskan for Hammarby IF.

References

External links

1986 births
Living people
Association football defenders
Swedish footballers
Swedish people of Syrian descent
Assyrian footballers
Syrian Christians
Allsvenskan players
Superettan players
Hammarby Fotboll players
AFC Eskilstuna players